Narrow Gauge and Industrial Railway Modelling Review is a quarterly British magazine. Roy C Link started the magazine back in 1989. In 2012 it transferred to Greystar Publications with Roy remaining the production editor. With the death of the Greystar proprietor and editor, Roy took back the editing and was sold under the Narrow Gauge and Industrial banner. In November 2020 Roy died and John Clutterbuck is now the editor.

The magazine specialises in narrow gauge and industrial railways from both a prototype and modeling perspective, concentrating on the United Kingdom, but also covering Europe and overseas subjects.

References

External links 
 Narrow Gauge & Industrial (Official site)

Quarterly magazines published in the United Kingdom
Magazines established in 1989
Rail transport modelling publications
Rail transport magazines published in the United Kingdom